3 is honeyhoney's third album, released June 9, 2015 and was produced by Dave Cobb.  The website American Songwriter reviewed it writing, "with a singer-songwriter that exudes the magnetic passion and swaggering star power of Santo, this is a group whose time has come."

Track list

Charts

References

2015 albums
Honeyhoney albums
Rounder Records albums
Albums produced by Dave Cobb